South Carolina Highway 381 (SC 381) is a  primary state highway in the U.S. state of South Carolina. It connects the towns in eastern Marlboro County.

Route description
SC 381 traverses from Blenheim at SC 38 to the North Carolina state line where it continues as North Carolina Highway 381 into Gibson, North Carolina.  As a two-lane rural highway, it connects the towns of Clio and McColl.

History
The highway was established in 1930 as a new primary route from SC 38 in Blenheim to SC 9 in Clio. In 1931 or 1932, it was extended north to SC 30 (today U.S. Route 15 (US 15) and US 401) in McColl; and west to the community of Marlboro. In 1934, the western extension was dropped while it extended north again to the North Carolina state line. In 1940, SC 381 was extended west again to SC 382 in Scott, only to be truncated back in Blenheim by 1948.

Major intersections

See also

References

External links

SC 381 at Virginia Highways' South Carolina Highways Annex

381
Transportation in Marlboro County, South Carolina